Véronique Delobel (born 17 June 1978) is a French former competitive ice dancer. With Olivier Chapuis, she is the 2000 Ondrej Nepela Memorial champion and competed on the senior Grand Prix series. She later competed briefly with Michael Zenezini.

She is the twin sister of Isabelle Delobel.

Results

With Zenezini

With Chapuis

With Taberlet

References

External links
 Icedance.com profile: Delobel & Chapuis at Archive.org

1978 births
Living people
Sportspeople from Clermont-Ferrand
French female ice dancers
French twins
Twin sportspeople
Competitors at the 2001 Winter Universiade
20th-century French women